The Douglas Historic District includes the commercial area of Douglas, Arizona, a mining company town established in 1901.  The dates of the buildings' construction range from 1901 to 1935.  The district is bordered on the south by the buildings on G and H Avenues between 15th and 8th Street, and lie only eight blocks from the United States - Mexico border.  The District includes architectural styles ranging from Queen Anne to Bungalow to Period Revival.  One of the most interesting features is Church Square, which contains four churches in a single block.  In 1930 the square was featured in Ripley's Believe It or Not, as the only block in the world which contained four churches: Grace Methodist (built 1902), St. Stephen's Episcopal (built 1903), First Baptist (built 1904), and First Presbyterian (built 1907).

Description of the district

The majority of the buildings in the district are one or two story, rectangular, commercial blocks. The Spanish Colonial Revival Gadsden Hotel, the Art Deco Airdome Theatre, the Bakery Building, the Neo-Classic Revival Post Office, and the Grand Theatre stand out as major architectural resources. The Gadsden Hotel and Grand Theatre are both individually listed on the National Register of Historic Places. Most buildings are either solid masonry or brick veneer, while others are adobe, reinforced concrete, or cast stone (rusticated concrete block). Several structures display elaborate terra cotta stone or brick ornamentation; others exhibit pressed metal ornamentation. Luxfer Prisms are utilized for transom lighting on some buildings, whereas newer 1930s and 1940s structures use glass block to a great extent.

Interspersed among the major buildings are one and two story buildings incorporating several construction techniques and exhibiting a variety of ornamental materials.  The smaller and older buildings of the district, particularly the early hotels, are of adobe construction. The Samson Hotel is the district's prime example of an early adobe hotel. Solid brick, or brick veneer, over a reinforced concrete or concrete block interior wall is the most common mode of construction in the district. Terra cotta is used on several commercial buildings, particularly on the east side of the 1100 block of G Avenue. Another material common in Douglas' residential areas, but rather uncommon in the District, is rusticated concrete block, or cast stone. The Watts Hotel (D-3), the Southwestern Hotel (D-4), the
Kline Block (D-33), and the Irene Building (D-34b) are the most noteworthy examples of cast stone construction in the district.

Typically, Douglas's commercial district grew with little thought of compatible land uses or visual cohesiveness, but the resulting streetscape displays an overall visual continuity. In general, smaller structures are found in the south end of the district, the 800 and 900 blocks, and in the northern portion of the linear district, the 1200, 1300, and 1400 blocks of G Avenue. The center of the district
is the 1100 block dominated by the Gadsden Hotel and the Grand Theatre, which are the major visual elements of the streetscape along G Avenue. Other key structures throughout the district range widely in size, age, and design. Buildings such as the Art Deco style Bakery Building (D-58), the Neo-Classic style Brophy Building, designed by architects Trost and Trost, the Masonic Temple, Marlin's
Saddle Shop, the Hotel Douglas-Arizona Club, and the Irene Building are the major commercial structures which illustrate Douglas's historical development as well as its architectural evolution during the district's significant growth period from 1910 through 1935.

Complementing these significant buildings are numerous contributing structures, lesser in size, significance, and detail, yet still essential to the overall impact and appearance of the district. These brick, stucco, or frame buildings retain most of their original architectural characteristics with few modifications, and possess enough integrity to contribute to the overall character of the district.
Of particular note throughout the district is the comparatively substantial use of sculpted terra cotta for facade ornamentation. The Grand Theatre is the dominant example due to its terra cotta facade. The 1917 date of the Grand Theatre predates the widespread use of terra cotta in the Southwest. There is also extensive terra cotta on the Airdome Theatre, designed by Trost and Trost and built circa 1925, and on the Neo-Classic style storefront of the Bank of Commerce Building at 1119 G Avenue.

Isolated throughout the district are structures which date from the historic period but which have been extensively modified or covered by contemporary sheathing. In many instances, facade restoration appears feasible, but the buildings are still considered non-contributing. The Phelps Dodge Mercantile, built in 1902-1903 and one of Douglas's most historically and architecturally significant buildings, has been encased in a modern shell; however, the interior remains largely intact, complete with pressed tin ceilings, stained wood wainscoting and balustrades, and highly polished wooden floors. Leaded and stained glass transom windows remain above the storefront entrances.

Contributing properties

Below is a table of the structures which contribute to the significance of the district.

References

National Register of Historic Places in Cochise County, Arizona
Historic districts in Arizona